Edward Magner (1 January 1891 in Newcastle upon Tyne – 16 July 1948) was a professional Association football manager. He managed Denmark before moving on to Huddersfield Town, where he managed during the Second World War, and Derby County, where he won a double of the Football League North and Midlands Cup in the 1944–45 season.

Magner was asked to coach the Denmark national football team for the 50th anniversary tournament of the Danish Football Association in 1939. He was seen as possessing a great natural authority, and he introduced a focus on physical conditioning unknown to the then strictly amateur-only Danish football. Magner managed Denmark for the two games at the tournament, as Denmark won against both Finland and Norway.

References

Bibliography

Magner, Ted: Remembering the forgotten manager (biography)

1891 births
1948 deaths
Footballers from Newcastle upon Tyne
English footballers
Association football defenders
Gainsborough Trinity F.C. players
Everton F.C. players
St Mirren F.C. players
English football managers
Expatriate football managers in Denmark
English expatriate sportspeople in Denmark
Olympique Lillois managers
FC Metz managers
Derby County F.C. managers
Ligue 1 players
English Football League players
Scottish Football League players
Huddersfield Town A.F.C. managers
English Football League managers
Denmark national football team managers
English expatriate football managers
English expatriate sportspeople in France
Expatriate football managers in the Netherlands
Expatriate football managers in France
Heracles Almelo managers